Jingzhou railway station may refer to:

 Jingzhou railway station (Hebei) (景州站)
 Jingzhou railway station (Hubei) (荆州站)
 Jingzhou railway station (Hunan) (靖州站)